Xiling may refer to:

 Xiling , now known as Hangzhou
 Xiling Society of the Seal Art, Hangzhou-based organisation for seal art
Xiling District (西陵区), Yichang, Hubei
Xiling Gorge (西陵峡), one of the Three Gorges
Xiling Bridge (西陵长江大桥), bridge over Yangtze River
 Xiling, Changning (西岭镇), a town of Changning City
 Lin Xiling (1935–2009), Chinese activist and dissident
 Shen Xiling (1904–1940), Chinese film director
 Xiong Xiling (1870–1937), premier of the Republic of China from July 1913 to February 1914

See also
 Xilin (disambiguation)